The Mordovia constituency (No.23) is a Russian legislative constituency covering the entirety of Mordovia.

Members elected

Election results

1993

|-
! colspan=2 style="background-color:#E9E9E9;text-align:left;vertical-align:top;" |Candidate
! style="background-color:#E9E9E9;text-align:left;vertical-align:top;" |Party
! style="background-color:#E9E9E9;text-align:right;" |Votes
! style="background-color:#E9E9E9;text-align:right;" |%
|-
|style="background-color: " |
|align=left|Vladimir Kartashov
|align=left|Communist Party
|
|22.06%
|-
|style="background-color:"|
|align=left|Ivan Kelin
|align=left|Independent
| -
|20.50%
|-
| colspan="5" style="background-color:#E9E9E9;"|
|- style="font-weight:bold"
| colspan="3" style="text-align:left;" | Total
| 
| 100%
|-
| colspan="5" style="background-color:#E9E9E9;"|
|- style="font-weight:bold"
| colspan="4" |Source:
|
|}

1995

|-
! colspan=2 style="background-color:#E9E9E9;text-align:left;vertical-align:top;" |Candidate
! style="background-color:#E9E9E9;text-align:left;vertical-align:top;" |Party
! style="background-color:#E9E9E9;text-align:right;" |Votes
! style="background-color:#E9E9E9;text-align:right;" |%
|-
|style="background-color:"|
|align=left|Nikolay Medvedev
|align=left|Independent
|
|31.77%
|-
|style="background-color:"|
|align=left|Lyudmila Ivanova
|align=left|Independent
|
|23.58%
|-
|style="background-color:#C28314"|
|align=left|Vladimir Ivliyev
|align=left|For the Motherland!
|
|6.77%
|-
|style="background-color:"|
|align=left|Vasily Guslyannikov
|align=left|Democratic Russia and Free Trade Unions
|
|6.44%
|-
|style="background-color:"|
|align=left|Nikolay Dugushkin
|align=left|Agrarian Party
|
|4.60%
|-
|style="background-color:"|
|align=left|Yury Mashkov
|align=left|Independent
|
|3.45%
|-
|style="background-color:"|
|align=left|Vladimir Kartashov (incumbent)
|align=left|Power to the People!
|
|3.29%
|-
|style="background-color:#2C299A"|
|align=left|Ivan Kelin
|align=left|Congress of Russian Communities
|
|3.09%
|-
|style="background-color:"|
|align=left|Anatoly Bolyayev
|align=left|Independent
|
|2.00%
|-
|style="background-color:"|
|align=left|Stanislav Kholopov
|align=left|Independent
|
|1.93%
|-
|style="background-color:#F21A29"|
|align=left|Antonina Krasnova
|align=left|Trade Unions and Industrialists – Union of Labour
|
|1.34%
|-
|style="background-color:#FE4801"|
|align=left|Aleksey Ladoshkin
|align=left|Pamfilova–Gurov–Lysenko
|
|1.01%
|-
|style="background-color:"|
|align=left|Yury Sotov
|align=left|Russian Party of Automobile Owners
|
|0.91%
|-
|style="background-color:#000000"|
|colspan=2 |against all
|
|7.06%
|-
| colspan="5" style="background-color:#E9E9E9;"|
|- style="font-weight:bold"
| colspan="3" style="text-align:left;" | Total
| 
| 100%
|-
| colspan="5" style="background-color:#E9E9E9;"|
|- style="font-weight:bold"
| colspan="4" |Source:
|
|}

1999

|-
! colspan=2 style="background-color:#E9E9E9;text-align:left;vertical-align:top;" |Candidate
! style="background-color:#E9E9E9;text-align:left;vertical-align:top;" |Party
! style="background-color:#E9E9E9;text-align:right;" |Votes
! style="background-color:#E9E9E9;text-align:right;" |%
|-
|style="background-color:#3B9EDF"|
|align=left|Viktor Grishin
|align=left|Fatherland – All Russia
|
|43.66%
|-
|style="background-color:"|
|align=left|Yevgeny Kosterin
|align=left|Communist Party
|
|20.73%
|-
|style="background-color:"|
|align=left|Nikolay Medvedev (incumbent)
|align=left|Yabloko
|
|13.93%
|-
|style="background-color:#FF4400"|
|align=left|Aleksandr Novikov
|align=left|Andrey Nikolayev and Svyatoslav Fyodorov Bloc
|
|3.66%
|-
|style="background-color:"|
|align=left|Nikolay Biryukov
|align=left|Russian All-People's Union
|
|3.46%
|-
|style="background-color:#084284"|
|align=left|Nikolay Makushkin
|align=left|Spiritual Heritage
|
|2.34%
|-
|style="background-color:#000000"|
|colspan=2 |against all
|
|9.59%
|-
| colspan="5" style="background-color:#E9E9E9;"|
|- style="font-weight:bold"
| colspan="3" style="text-align:left;" | Total
| 
| 100%
|-
| colspan="5" style="background-color:#E9E9E9;"|
|- style="font-weight:bold"
| colspan="4" |Source:
|
|}

2003

|-
! colspan=2 style="background-color:#E9E9E9;text-align:left;vertical-align:top;" |Candidate
! style="background-color:#E9E9E9;text-align:left;vertical-align:top;" |Party
! style="background-color:#E9E9E9;text-align:right;" |Votes
! style="background-color:#E9E9E9;text-align:right;" |%
|-
|style="background-color:"|
|align=left|Viktor Grishin (incumbent)
|align=left|United Russia
|
|77.51%
|-
|style="background-color:"|
|align=left|Yevgeny Kosterin
|align=left|Communist Party
|
|8.02%
|-
|style="background-color:#1042A5"|
|align=left|Aleksandr Polushkin
|align=left|Union of Right Forces
|
|2.63%
|-
|style="background-color:"|
|align=left|Oleg Aleshkin
|align=left|Liberal Democratic Party
|
|2.21%
|-
|style="background-color:#00A1FF"|
|align=left|Viktor Nechayev
|align=left|Party of Russia's Rebirth-Russian Party of Life
|
|1.02%
|-
|style="background-color:#164C8C"|
|align=left|Sergey Kalashnikov
|align=left|United Russian Party Rus'
|
|0.71%
|-
|style="background-color:"|
|align=left|Mikhail Davydkin
|align=left|Independent
|
|0.69%
|-
|style="background-color:#000000"|
|colspan=2 |against all
|
|5.59%
|-
| colspan="5" style="background-color:#E9E9E9;"|
|- style="font-weight:bold"
| colspan="3" style="text-align:left;" | Total
| 
| 100%
|-
| colspan="5" style="background-color:#E9E9E9;"|
|- style="font-weight:bold"
| colspan="4" |Source:
|
|}

2016

|-
! colspan=2 style="background-color:#E9E9E9;text-align:left;vertical-align:top;" |Candidate
! style="background-color:#E9E9E9;text-align:leftt;vertical-align:top;" |Party
! style="background-color:#E9E9E9;text-align:right;" |Votes
! style="background-color:#E9E9E9;text-align:right;" |%
|-
|style="background-color:"|
|align=left|Vitaly Yefimov
|align=left|United Russia
|
|81.84%
|-
|style="background-color:"|
|align=left|Yevgeny Tyurin
|align=left|Liberal Democratic Party
|
|5.06%
|-
|style="background-color:"|
|align=left|Dmitry Kuzyakin
|align=left|Communist Party
|
|4.71%
|-
|style="background:"| 
|align=left|Timur Geraskin
|align=left|A Just Russia
|
|3.54%
|-
|style="background-color: " |
|align=left|Armen Yeranosyan
|align=left|Communists of Russia
|
|0.97%
|-
|style="background:"| 
|align=left|Sergey Sorokin
|align=left|Rodina
|
|0.94%
|-
|style="background-color: "|
|align=left|Yulia Ivanova
|align=left|Party of Growth
|
|0.83%
|-
|style="background-color: "|
|align=left|Larisa Konnova
|align=left|Patriots of Russia
|
|0.67%
|-
|style="background:"| 
|align=left|Vladimir Gridin
|align=left|Yabloko
|
|0.64%
|-
| colspan="5" style="background-color:#E9E9E9;"|
|- style="font-weight:bold"
| colspan="3" style="text-align:left;" | Total
| 
| 100%
|-
| colspan="5" style="background-color:#E9E9E9;"|
|- style="font-weight:bold"
| colspan="4" |Source:
|
|}

2021

|-
! colspan=2 style="background-color:#E9E9E9;text-align:left;vertical-align:top;" |Candidate
! style="background-color:#E9E9E9;text-align:left;vertical-align:top;" |Party
! style="background-color:#E9E9E9;text-align:right;" |Votes
! style="background-color:#E9E9E9;text-align:right;" |%
|-
|style="background-color:"|
|align=left|Yulia Ogloblina
|align=left|United Russia
|
|57.44%
|-
|style="background-color:"|
|align=left|Dmitry Kuzyakin
|align=left|Communist Party
|
|13.45%
|-
|style="background-color:"|
|align=left|Yevgeny Tyurin
|align=left|Liberal Democratic Party
|
|8.68%
|-
|style="background-color: " |
|align=left|Timur Geraskin
|align=left|A Just Russia — For Truth
|
|6.30%
|-
|style="background-color: "|
|align=left|Sergey Belov
|align=left|Party of Pensioners
|
|4.10%
|-
|style="background-color: "|
|align=left|Maksim Zinin
|align=left|New People
|
|4.00%
|-
|style="background-color: " |
|align=left|Aleksandr Toporkov
|align=left|Communists of Russia
|
|3.41%
|-
| colspan="5" style="background-color:#E9E9E9;"|
|- style="font-weight:bold"
| colspan="3" style="text-align:left;" | Total
| 
| 100%
|-
| colspan="5" style="background-color:#E9E9E9;"|
|- style="font-weight:bold"
| colspan="4" |Source:
|
|}

Notes

References

Russian legislative constituencies
Politics of Mordovia